Wau/Bulolo Urban LLG is a local-level government (LLG) located in the Bulolo Valley of Morobe Province, Papua New Guinea.

Wards
80. Bulolo Urban
81. Wau Urban

References

Local-level governments of Morobe Province